Forrestia can be one of these two plant genera:

Forrestia Raf., synonym of the genus Ceanothus.
Forrestia A.Rich., synonym of the genus Amischotolype .